The Pakistan Tehreek-e-Insaf (PTI;) is a political party in Pakistan. It was founded in 1996 by Pakistani cricketer-turned-politician Imran Khan, who served as the country's prime minister from 2018 to 2022. The PTI is one of the three major Pakistani political parties alongside the Pakistan Muslim League–Nawaz (PML–N) and the Pakistan People's Party (PPP), and it is the largest party in terms of representation in the National Assembly of Pakistan since the 2018 general election. With over 10 million members in Pakistan and abroad, it claims to be the country's largest political party by primary membership as well as one of the largest political parties in the world.

Despite Khan's popular persona in Pakistan, the PTI had limited initial success: it failed to win, as a collective, a single seat in the 1997 general election and the 2002 general election; only Khan himself was able to win a seat. Throughout the 2000s, the PTI remained in opposition to the presidency of Pervez Musharraf, who had spearheaded a military government under the Pakistan Muslim League–Quaid (PML–Q) since the 1999 coup d'état; it also boycotted the 2008 general election, accusing it of having been conducted with fraudulent procedures under Musharraf's rule. The global popularity of the "Third Way" during the Musharraf era led to the rise of a new Pakistani political bloc focused on centrism, deviating from the traditional dominance of the centre-left PPP and the centre-right PML–N. When the PML–Q began to decline in the aftermath of Musharraf's presidency, much of its centrist voter bank was lost to the PTI. Around the same time, the PPP's popularity began to decrease after the disqualification of Yousaf Raza Gillani in 2012. Similarly, the PTI appealed to many former PPP voters, particularly in the provinces of Punjab and Khyber Pakhtunkhwa, due to its outlook on populism.

In the 2013 general election, the PTI emerged as a major party with over 7.5 million votes, ranking second by number of votes and third by number of seats won. At the provincial level, it was voted to power in Khyber Pakhtunkhwa. In the 2018 general election, it received 16.9 million votes—the largest amount for any political party in Pakistan thus far. It then formed the national government in coalition with five other parties for the first time, with Khan serving as the new Pakistani prime minister. However, in April 2022, a no-confidence motion against Khan removed him and his PTI government from office at the federal level. Currently, the PTI governs Khyber Pakhtunkhwa and Punjab at the provincial level and acts as the largest opposition party in Sindh, while also having significant representation in Balochistan.

Officially, the PTI has stated that its focus is on turning Pakistan into a model welfare state espousing Islamic socialism, and also on dismantling religious discrimination against Pakistani minorities. The PTI terms itself an anti– movement advocating an Islamic democracy centred on egalitarianism. It claims to be the only non-dynastic party of mainstream Pakistani politics in contrast to parties such as the PPP and PML–N. Since 2019, the party has been criticized by political opponents and analysts alike for its failures to address various economic and political issues, particularly the Pakistani economy, which was further weakened in light of the COVID-19 pandemic. However, Khan and the PTI were later praised for leading the country’s economic recovery in the pandemic's later stages. During its time in power, the party faced backlash over its crackdown on the Pakistani opposition as well as its regulation of increased censorship through curbs on Pakistani media outlets and freedom of speech.

In a second wave of expansion, PTI absorbed Pervaiz Elahi, Moonis Elahi and ten former MPAs of Pakistan Muslim League (Q) over political rifts with the President of Pakistan Muslim League (Q), Chaudhry Shujaat Hussain. He was the former president of the Punjab Division of the PML(Q). On 7th March 2023, Pervaiz Elahi has taken the charge of President of PTI. However, as per the constitution of PTI that was approved on 1st August 2022 by Chairman PTI and National Council, the position of President doesn't exist in the structure of the party.

History

Formative years
Pakistan Tehreek-e-Insaf was founded by Imran Khan on 25 April 1996 in Lahore. Founded initially as a sociopolitical movement, in June 1996 the first Central Executive Committee of Pakistan Tehreek-e-Insaf was formed under the leadership of Imran Khan, including Naeemul Haque, Ahsan Rasheed, Hafeez Khan, Mowahid Hussain, Mahmood Awan and Nausherwan Burki as founding members. PTI began to grow slowly but did not achieve immediate popularity.

Expansion
In October 2002, Khan ran for office in the National Elections and became a member of parliament (MP) for Mianwali, his home town. Khan, however, remained deeply critical of the entire political order of Pakistan, which he deemed corrupt, inefficient, and morally bereft of any of the founding principles of Pakistan. In protest, Khan began a grassroots campaign to raise awareness about his political party.

After Benazir Bhutto was assassinated in 2007 and Nawaz Sharif returned from self-exile in Saudi Arabia, pressure increased upon President Musharraf to hold democratic elections. PTI, in conjunction with many political parties, joined the All Parties Democratic Movement, which was opposed to further military rule. The general election in 2008 resulted in a PPP victory. This election was boycotted by PTI. A membership drive in November and December 2008 resulted in 150,000 people joining the party.

Ascent to power

PTI emerged as a major party in 2013 Pakistani general election. Public distress on various issues against the government in following years, led PTI to emerge as a single largest political party in 2018 Pakistani general election and subsequent formation of a coalition government.

Positions

Domestic
Following its ascent to national government of Pakistan, PTI backed off from certain commitments in its manifesto what was criticised by its opponents as U-turns. The PTI also raised issue of religious tolerance and greater representation for minorities. On 20 February 2013 PTI launched its 'Education Policy' with plans to introduce a uniform education system with one curriculum in three languages for Urdu, English and regional languages for entire Pakistan in primary schools. PTI promised to crack down on police brutality, restructure the civil service, reform the electoral system, allow for a truly independent judiciary, decentralise state power, and enforce laws which extend personal liberty. The PTI proposed civilian control of Pakistan's military. The Inter-Services Intelligence service would report directly to the Prime Minister of Pakistan, and the defence budget would be audited by the government. Imran Khan also pledged to resign should any terrorism take place from Pakistani soil following these reforms.

PTI organised a protest against drone attacks in Pakistan on 23 November 2013 at Peshawar, where it called on the federal government to force an end to U.S. CIA drone attacks and to block NATO supplies through the country to Afghanistan. "We will put pressure on America, and our protest will continue if drone attacks are not stopped." The U.S. embassy declined to comment on the protest that also temporarily closed a route leading to one of two border crossings used for the shipments.

The PTI advocated the establishment of South Punjab and Gilgit Baltistan as official provinces in Pakistan.

Foreign policy

The PTI hopes to have a relationship with the US that would be based on "self-dignity and respect" and promised to stop all foreign aid to Pakistan. Imran Khan, the leader of PTI claimed ‘having relations with US, Russia and China is in Pakistan’s interest’ and Pakistan's ‘future is tied up with Russia’. The PTI also promised to make Kashmir issue a top priority and would try and solve the issue permanently so that Pakistan no longer has any border or territorial disputes with any of its neighbours.

Second wave of expansion

Absorption of PML(Q) members into PTI 
In the second wave of expansion, the PTI welcomed Pervaiz Elahi, Moonis Elahi and ten former MPAs of the Pakistan Muslim League (Q) (PML(Q)) into the party after political rifts emerged between the President of the PML(Q), Chaudhry Shujaat Hussain and Pervaiz Elahi. Elahi was the former president of the Punjab Division of the PML(Q). On 7 March 2023, Pervaiz Elahi took the charge as the President of PTI, a party position that was previously held by Javed Hashmi. However, as per the constitution of the PTI that was approved on 1 August 2022 by Imran Khan and the party's National Council, the position of President doesn't exist in the structure of the party.

Absorption of PML(Z) members into PTI 
On 19 March 2023, Ijaz-ul-Haq, the leader of the Pakistan Muslim League (Z) (PML(Z)) along with his party members, joined the PTI after meeting with Imran Khan. The PML(Z) was also merged into the PTI.

Organization and structure

Administration

The National Council is the PTI governing body. Its members are:
 Office bearers of the provincial organizations
 Presidents of regional organizations
 Presidents of district organizations
 Five members nominated by each of the women, youth, students, labour, farmers, minorities, lawyers and overseas organisations
 Advisors nominated by the chairman

The National Council elects central office-bearers.

Intra-party elections
In March 2012, PTI announced to hold US-style intra-party election, according to a press briefing the US-style candidate nomination and ticket-awarding process, PTI would aim to introduce local caucuses on district levels throughout the country. Aspiring candidates would undertake debates and undergo primaries to win a party ticket for contesting on Provincial Assembly or National Assembly seats. The elections were held from October 2012 and ended on 23 March 2013 where the party finally elected the National Council after a long drawn electoral process with over four million registered members for their electoral college. With these elections, PTI has become Pakistan's first political party to hold the largest intraparty election from the general electoral base.

Central functions

Most of PTI's central leadership was elected, Imran Khan and Shah Mehmood Qureshi were elected on 20 March 2013. The Secretary information, Secretary Finance, Secretary Social Media, Secretary Political Training, and Secretary Policy Planning are appointed by the chairman and confirmed by the CEC. The executive committee consists of the Central Office bearers (above) and thirty members to be nominated by the chairman from amongst the members of the National Council.

Provincial Council

The elected Provincial Council was finalised on 18 March 2013 for a 4-year term by the various districts of each province it is as follows Punjab, Sindh, Baluchistan & Khyber Pakhtunkhwa.

Party wings

Central Tarbiyati Council (CTC)
In June 2014, a Central Tarbiyati Council was created whose convener is Firdous Shamim Naqvi, In-charge for Curriculum Development Abdul Quayyum Khan Kundi, In-charge Material Production Khawar Shamsul Hasan, In-charge Implementation and Monitoring Col Ejaz Minhas. The Tarbiyati Council will be responsible to train party activists on ideology, election campaigns, and other organizational matters.

PTI Women Wing
Pakistan Tehreek-e-Insaf has a dedicated central wing for women, led by Nausheen Hamid as its elected president and Seemi Ezdi as its elected general secretary. PTI strongly declares its recognition of the rights of women and undertakes to promote and implement policies that protect women from all strata of society, especially the middle and working classes, recognising urban and rural as equal citizens and encouraging the participation of women in national and political life. Pakistan Tehreek-e-Insaf strongly believes in the representation of women at all decision-making levels.

Insaf Student Federation (ISF)
The Insaf Student Federation is the official student wing of Pakistan Tehreek-e-Insaf. ISF is present in all provinces of Pakistan. ISF has held many protests and rallies in all parts of Pakistan to create awareness about different issues.

Insaf Youth Wing
Pakistan Tehreek-e-Insaf has a youth wing for people under the age of 40 to help bring attention to their issues and problems. PTI Youth Wing is led by Ali Abbas Bukhari as the elected president.

People with disabilities
On 18 March 2013 Pakistan Tehreek-e-Insaf became the first political party in Pakistan to announce a comprehensive policy for persons with disabilities (PWD). In its vision PTI would like to ensure the rights of disabled people and they be provided with enough opportunities to play their vital role in society. The party strongly believes in the implementation of the 1991 ordinance which ensured a special quota for persons with disabilities. PTI will acknowledge, facilitate and empower all PWDs enabling them to lead independent and self-fulfilling lives. PTI will also raise awareness about the integration of persons with disabilities into society would work towards the prevention of certain avoidable disabilities through early diagnosis and medical treatment. Fulfilling its commitment to persons with disabilities, the KPK government led by the PTI has approved a budget of over Rs 59 Million initially to help provide rehabilitation services to handicapped people at the local hospital near to their area, it is initially slated to be launched in all 25 districts of the province but will expand further with additional budgetary provisions.

Insaf Research Wing
Insaf Research Wing (IRW) was a part of Pakistan Tehreek-e-Insaf (PTI) created to carry out research to find solutions for problems in Pakistan. IRW was created in 2009 to carry out research to find solutions for problems in Pakistan. The foremost goal of IRW was to keep the people of Pakistan and PTI informed and prepared. The wing was composed of 9 committees. Each committee addressed issues related to its field of expertise, which included socio-political, information & technology, economics, energy, healthcare, corruption, foreign affairs, education & environment. The research reports/papers were either commissioned by the central executive committee of PTI or committee members of IRW. The IRW did not follow a preset ideology while carrying out research, nor did it endorse any opinion presented in a published report/paper as an official position. Any published document by the wing did not constitute it as an official position of PTI unless otherwise stated. IRW operated at a national level but its members were located throughout the world bringing in the much needed international experience. IRW practised an open membership policy valid for all Pakistanis regardless of religion or race.

The IRW has since been replaced by the Insaf Research Team.

Electoral performance

Pakistan Tehreek-e-Insaf contested the general elections of 1997, 2002, 2013 and 2018. It boycotted the 2008 general elections.

Local Bodies

1997 and 2002 general elections
Less than a year after its founding, PTI contested the 1997 general elections. Imran Khan stood in seven constituencies across Pakistan but did not win a majority in any.

In the 2002 general elections, party chairman Imran Khan won one seat from Mianwali. PTI secured 0.8% of the popular vote.

2008 general elections
PTI openly boycotted the Pakistani general election on 18 February 2008 because it believed that the election was fraudulent and laced with irregularities.

2013 general elections
On 21 April 2013 Khan, the chairman of PTI, launched his campaign for the 2013 elections from Lahore where he addressed supporters at The Mall, Lahore followed by prayers at the Data Durbar Complex. which was followed by large rallies in Karak and Dera Ismail Khan. He also announced that he would pull Pakistan out of the US-led war on terror and bring peace in the Pashtun tribal belt. On 22 April 2013 Khan addressed different public meetings in Malakand, Lower Dir District and Upper Dir District where he announced that PTI will introduce a uniform education system in which the children of rich and poor will have equal opportunities.

On the same day he spoke at a rally in Rawalpindi's Constituency NA-56 accompanied by Shaikh Rasheed Ahmad. On 23 April 2013 Khan addressed large rallies in Renala Khurd, Okara and other parts of Sahiwal Division. He challenged PML-N President Nawaz Sharif to a live debate, a challenge which PML-N was quick to decline. On 24 April, Khan addressed rallies Nankana Sahib District, Sheikhupura and Pattoki where he announced that once he comes to power no parliamentarian will receive development funds as they are misused for achieving political gains.

On 25 April 2013 Khan addressed political gatherings in South Punjab including in Pakpattan, Lodhran and Vehari. On the following day Khan continued his mass campaign in South Punjab, he addressed rallies at Jalalpur Pirwala, Muzaffargarh, Mian Channu, Kabirwala and Khanewal where he promised to end the system of tyranny and announced that once in power he will make law which will allow every village or town to elect its own Station House Officer which he believes will prevent corruption and police brutality, he also promised to eliminate the post of Patwari and make a computerised and professional land record system.

Khan ended his south Punjab campaign by addressing rallies at Bahawalpur, Khanpur, Sadiqabad, Rahim Yar Khan and Rajanpur on 27 April. During the campaign he collectively visited over 25 towns and cities and addressed dozens of rallies and corner meetings, at the end he promised to hang the killers behind the assassination of Benazir Bhutto he also said that the local government system is important for the prosperity of Pakistan. On 28 April, Khan moved to central Punjab where he addressed large rallies at Mandi Bahauddin, Hafizabad and Sargodha while promising people to bring justice and equality to Pakistan.

On 29 April 2013 Khan addressed rallies at Murree, Talagang, Chakwal, Taxila and Attock. On 30 April, Khan visited his home town of Mianwali where he addressed several rallies, he lashed out on Bhutto's and Sharif's. He is quoted to say 'You can't lead revolution from behind bulletproof glass' he also claimed that he had conquered fear of dying 17 years ago. On 1 and 2 March, Khan addressed gatherings in Sibi, Loralai, Zafarwal, Pasrur, Narowal, Jacobabad and also led a car rally in Rawalpindi. On 3 May Khan continued his campaign at Battagram, Mansehra, Torghar District, Abbottabad and Haripur, followed by rallies at Buner District, Swabi, Charsadda, Mardan, Nowshera and Peshawar on 4th while promising to abandon war on terror.

2013 general election results
Pakistan's 2013 elections were held on 11 May 2013 throughout the country. The elections resulted in a clear majority of the Pakistan Muslim League (N), a strong rival of Pakistan Tehreek-e-Insaf but it did managed to take over the Pakistan Peoples Party as the main opposition to PML-N's candidates in the Punjab Province where the parties popularity was able to push 20 representatives to the Punjab Assembly. PTI also emerged as the second largest party in Karachi.

While according to non-official results announced by Pakistani media and the Election Commission of Pakistan. Imran Khan, Chairman of PTI won three of the four constituencies he contested winning from Constituency NA-1, Constituency NA-56 and Constituency NA-71. While Khan's party PTI won 31 directly elected parliamentary seats which is more than 300 per cent more than it got in 2002 elections. PTI was third-largest party nationally as well as being the largest in Khyber Pakhtunkhwa and second largest in Punjab. In Khyber Pakhtunkhwa, PTI defeated all mainstream political parties across the province with mostly new candidates. It also won every seat in Peshawar, Nowshera and Mardan district, it is expected that PTI will lead a coalition government in the province. PTI couldn't manage to win a majority in Punjab but made some wins while barely managed to make any inroads in Sindh or Baluchistan. PTI got 34 out of 99 seats in the Khyber Pakhtunkhwa Assembly.

Khyber Pakhtunkhwa
According to the polling data available, PTI performed considerably well in Central and Southern Khyber Pakhtunkhwa, while it ceded ground to Jamaat-e-Islami and Jamiat Ulema (F) in Northern Pakhtunkhwa.

In Khyber Pakhtunkhwa proper, the party failed to get more than 5% of the polled vote in only one constituency, NA-22 Battagram. The party also didn't fare well in FATA which borders the Pakhtunkhwa province. Here PTI won only one constituency, NA-47, out of 12 while failing to win more than 5% of the vote in 3 constituencies NA-36, NA-37, NA-41.

Punjab

In Punjab, the party performed the best in the North and the South, where its largest share of seats came from. It managed to win more than 5% of the vote in all constituencies of Northern Punjab. While in Southern Punjab its support was mainly concentrated in Multan along with a belt of districts surrounding it, which include Khanewal, Vehari and Pakpattan. Its performance was lackluster in Rajanpur, Dera Ghazi Khan, Bahawalnagar, and Muzaffargarh.

PTI's performance in Central Punjab was limited to gains in the districts of Mianwali, Lahore, Sahiwal, Nankana Sahib, Sheikhupura and Faisalabad. Mianwali district, from where the party's leader, Imran Khan belongs, saw the highest votes polled in the favor of PTI in Punjab at an average of 59.85% in the district's two constituencies. Among other major districts, it performed the worst in Jhang and Sargodha. In Sargodha, it failed to win more than 5% of the vote in 3 out of 5 constituencies, while in Jhang the party failed to field candidates in 3 out of 6 constituencies and got more than 5% vote in only one constituency, NA-86. Hafizabad, Bhakkar and Gujranwala were other weak showings of PTI in Central Punjab.

Sindh

Apart from Karachi, Sindh was mainly neglected by PTI during much of its election campaign and it shows in the results. The party failed to field its candidates in 19 out of Interior Sindh's 40 constituencies. Where it did field its candidates, it failed to clear the 5% vote benchmark in 18 constituencies. In most such constituencies, the order of the votes was in the hundreds. PTI's only strong showing in interior Sindh was in the constituencies of NA-228 Umerkot and, NA-230 Tharparkar where, the party's vice president, Shah Mehmood Qureshi's spiritual Ghousia Jamaat has a considerable following.

In Karachi, PTI bagged an average of 20.37% across 18 of 20 constituencies it participated in. The constituency NA-250 of Karachi recorded the highest percentage of votes polled in the favor of PTI at 61.38%.

Balochistan

In Balochistan, the situation was similar to that of interior Sindh. PTI failed to field its candidates in 4 out of the province's 13 constituencies. Further on, it didn't receive more than 5% of the vote in 7 of the remaining 9. Votes in most of these cases were mere hundreds. It performed relatively well in NA-259 of Quetta proper and NA-265 Sibi where the party got 14.83% and 6.99% of the vote respectively.

2018 general elections
Pakistan's 2018 elections were held on 25 July 2018 throughout the country. The elections resulted in a clear majority of the Pakistan Tehreek-e-Insaf in the National assembly with 116 won seats. After 28 women and 5 Minority seats, the total number of seats reached 149. Pakistan Tehreek-e-Insaf obtained 0.16 million votes with 31.82% of total cast votes, hence forming a government in the center with the alliance of MQM-P, PML (Q), BAP, BNP-M, GDA, AML and JWP. PTI also formed government in 
Khyber Pakhtunkhwa by having 78 seats, Punjab by having 175 seats and a government of alliance in Balochistan. Following Elections Imran Khan was elected as Prime minister obtaining 176 against Shehbaz Sharif who obtained 96 votes. PTI was also successful in electing its Speaker and deputy speaker national assembly, Asad Qaiser and Qasim Suri respectively. On 4 September 2018, Arif Alvi got elected as 13th President of Pakistan. PTI nominated Usman Ahmad Khan Buzdar as C.M. Punjab, Mahmood Khan as C.M. KPK and Jam Kamal Khan as C.M. Balochistan. The party also appointed its governors ; Muhammad Sarwar as Governor of Punjab, Pakistan, Imran Ismail as Governor of Sindh and Shah Farman as Governor of Khyber Pakhtunkhwa. Prime Minister of Pakistan, Imran Khan appointed his cabinet with key appointments of Minister of Finance given to Asad Umar and Minister of Foreign Affairs to Shah Mehmood Qureshi.

Presence across provincial assemblies

Khyber Pakhtunkhwa

In the northwestern province Khyber Pakhtunkhwa the PTI formed a governing coalition with the Jamaat-e-Islami and Qaumi Watan parties. On 13 May 2013, Parvez Khattak was appointed Chief Minister of Khyber Pakhtunkhwa. The Khyber Pakhtunkhwa Development Advisory Committee includes Asad Umar, Jehangir Khan Tareen, Ali Asghar Khan, Khalid Mehsud and Rustam Shah Mohmand. There are 15 ministers selected from the coalition govt to form the cabinet for Chief Minister Parvez Khattak.

Controversies
The party since the 2013 elections has been involved in several controversies.

Foreign funding case

Protests and civil disobedience
PTI launched its first dharna on 14 August 2014. The party was involved in laying siege and paralyzing the capital of Pakistan, Islamabad to stop the Government from functioning. PTI was charged with targeting Pakistan television and parliament and also targeting law enforcement.

The party founder Imran Khan burned his utility bills to encourage the participants to join his protest against rising electricity prices.

Justice Wajihuddin tribunal
PTI former leader and in charge for party election tribunal to investigate the corruption and fraud and PTI's internal election rigging. His tribunal expelled Secretary general Jahangir Tareen, PTI's KPK Chief Minister Pervez Khattak and senior leader Nadir Laghari after for manipulating intro-party polls and also reported frauds in party funds.

Wajihuddin was later expelled from the party by Imran Khan.

Attacks on journalists and harassment of women by alleged PTI supporters
PTI supporters have been reported to have attacked media persons during their protest demos. Several female journalists have reported harassment by the party workers. The harassment of women has also been reported in PTI's gatherings.

During PTI's public protests, Geo News DSNG's had to remove their stickers in order to escape party workers' vandalism. PTI workers also attacked Geo News Islamabad office.

Allegations of conspiracy to dissolve government using judiciary
PTI's ex-president Makhdoom Javed Hashmi has alleged that Imran Khan was conspiring to dissolve the government with the Supreme court's chief justice Nasirul Mulk.

See also

Politics of Pakistan
List of political parties in Pakistan
List of student federations of Pakistan
List of Pakistan Tehreek-e-Insaf MPs

References

Further reading

The News International February 22,2023 Pervaiz Elahi Joins PTI Named Central President retrieved 25 February 2023

External links
PTI Manifesto

 
1996 establishments in Pakistan
Islamic democratic political parties
Nationalist parties in Pakistan
Social democratic parties in Pakistan